99–'00 Demos is a compilation album by Local H of demos recorded by the band in 1999 and 2000. It was released by G&P Records, which is the band's official online merchandiser. It was first announced as being available exclusively at the June 9, 2006 Local H performance at the Metro in Chicago, but it has since been available at later shows.

The demos were recorded in what the band refers to as 'The Last Golden Age of Demonstrations', the demo sessions for what would become their fourth album, 2002's Here Comes the Zoo. All of the songs from that album appear in demo form here, with the exception of "5th Ave. Crazy". Also, three of the songs from The No Fun EP, which were the only three songs that weren't covers on that release, appear here in demo form. The disc is rounded out by five songs which were all previously unreleased, with the exception of "Halcion Daze" which was previously released on a compilation, in the same form as it is here. That makes it the only song whose version appears on this album to have been previously released.

Halcion Daze was completely re-written from the ground up and is now Halcyon Days, the last track on Whatever Happened to P.J. Soles.  Foolish Notions is part of Here Comes the Zoo, but the title was changed to Bryn-Mawr Stomp.

Song Notes 
 Tracks 2, 5, 6, 7, 8, 11, 12, 13 and 15 are demo versions of songs that appeared on Here Comes the Zoo. Notes about these songs:
 "Foolish Notions" was renamed to "Bryn-Mawr Stomp"
 "Rock 'N' Roll Pros" was renamed to "Rock & Roll Professionals"
 "Creature Instrumental" is an instrumental demo of "Creature Comforted"
 "(Baby Wants to) Edit Me" is a shorter demo version of "(Baby Wants to) Tame Me"
 Tracks 3, 9 and 14 are demo versions of songs that appeared on The No Fun EP
 In the liner notes, Lucas says that "Halcion Daze" was, quote: "all set to be the closing track to Here Comes the Zoo."  While recording this album, however, Queens of the Stone Age released  "Feel Good Hit of the Summer" on their 2000 album Rated R.  Lucas felt the two songs were too similar (both musically and lyrically) and scrapped this idea.  The song was later re-written into "Halcyon Days (Where Were You Then?)" as the closing track to Whatever Happened to P.J. Soles?.

Track listing 
 "Hello, Everyone" – 6:25
 "Son of "Cha!" " – 3:20
 "President Forever" – 3:25
 "Payback Is A Mother" – 4:39
 "Keep Yr Girlfriend" – 3:11
 "Foolish Notions" – 2:39
 "Rock 'N' Roll Pros" – 3:57
 "Hands On The Bible" – 3:56
 "Cooler Heads" – 3:32
 "Hazer" – 3:40
 "What Would You Have Me Do?" – 5:11
 "Creature Instrumental" – 1:47
 "Half-Life" – 3:45
 "No Fun" – 4:14
 "(Baby Wants To) Edit Me" – 4:26
 "Lazy Crazy" – 3:07
 "Halcion Daze" – 5:05
 Contains a hidden track which appears to be a segment of a demo version of "(Baby Wants to) Tame Me"

Credits 
 Scott Lucas – vocals, guitar, bass (Listed as Scott Lucas: ?)
 Brian St. Clair – drums

Local H compilation albums
Self-released albums
2006 compilation albums
Demo albums